William James MacDonald (1877 – 1966) was a Scottish footballer who played in the Scottish Football League for Dundee, and in the Football League for Derby County and Stoke.

Career
MacDonald was born in Inverness and began his career with Dundee. He joined English side Derby County in December 1898 and helped the Rams reach the 1899 FA Cup Final where they met Sheffield United, MacDonald played in the final as the Blades proved too sharp for Derby winning 4–1. He only played eight matches in 1899–1900 and left Derby at the end of the season. He returned to Dundee during the next season then joined Stoke where he played nine matches in 1901–02, scoring three goals.

Career statistics
Source:

Honours
 FA Cup runner-up: 1898–99

References

Scottish footballers
Stoke City F.C. players
Derby County F.C. players
English Football League players
Scottish Football League players
1877 births
1966 deaths
Dundee F.C. players
Footballers from Inverness
Date of birth missing
Date of death missing
Place of death missing
Association football inside forwards
FA Cup Final players